Baladeh Rural District or Bala Deh Rural District may refer to:
 Bala Deh Rural District (Fars Province)
 Baladeh Rural District (Mazandaran Province)